The Cère is a  long river in south-western France, left tributary of the Dordogne. Its source is in the south-western Massif Central, near the mountain Plomb du Cantal. It flows generally west through the following départements and towns:

 Cantal: Vic-sur-Cère, Arpajon-sur-Cère (near Aurillac)
 Corrèze 
 Lot: Bretenoux

The Cère flows into the Dordogne near Bretenoux.

References

Rivers of France
Rivers of Auvergne-Rhône-Alpes
Rivers of Occitania (administrative region)
Rivers of Nouvelle-Aquitaine
Rivers of Corrèze
Rivers of Lot (department)
Rivers of Cantal